The LIX Legislature of the Congress of Guanajuato met from September 2003 to September 2006. All members of the Congress were elected in the 2003 Guanajuato state elections.

Composition by party
The LIX Legislature consisted of 36 deputies.

LIX Legislature